Glanidium ribeiroi is a species of driftwood catfishes found in the Iguaçu River basin in South America.

Etymology
The catfish is named  in honor of Brazilian ichthyologist-herpetologist Alípio de Miranda Ribeiro (1874-1939), who was Secretary of the National Museum in Rio de Janeiro.

References

Soares-Porto, L.M., 1998. Monophyly and interrelationships of the Centromochlinae (Siluriformes: Auchenipteridae). p. 331-350. In L.R. Malabarba, R.E. Reis, R.P. Vari, Z.M.S. Lucena and C.A.S. Lucena (eds.) Phylogeny and classification of neotropical fishes. Porto Alegre: EDIPUCRS. 

Catfish of South America
Taxa named by John Diederich Haseman
Fish described in 1911
Auchenipteridae